Bonifacio López Pulido (Montehermoso, 14 May 1774 – Segovia, 3 December 1827) was a Spanish priest of the Roman Catholic Church, who became bishop of the Diocese of Urgel, and the Diocese of Segovia.

Biography
Born into a poor farming family, on 15 November 1789 he entered the Convent of San Vicente de Plasencia, aged 13 and lived there until he was ordained a priest. In this convent he taught Philosophy and held the Chair of Moral Theology.

He was appointed Teacher of Students in the Monastery of Santa María de Trianos of the Diocese of León. Later he was transferred to Santo Domingo de La Coruña as a reader of Sacred Theology.
He was arrested by Napoleon's invading troops, as they considered him a spy, but escaped execution. He fled to Madrid where he was  confessor of the Royal Family and later he was elected prior of the Convent of Our Lady of Atocha. However, on 4 November 1822, the convent was surrounded by national troops. He allowed the soldiers, to search the convent.

On 28 October 1824 the king appointed him Bishop of Urgel and the investiture service took place on 6 March 1825, in the royal chapel.
On 21 May 1827 he was promoted bishop of Segovia. On December 3 of that year he died in Segovia with a fever, at the age of fifty-three.

He was a model bishop who followed the rule of Santo Domingo. He was noted there for his assistance to the poor, sick and imprisoned and for his work in the pulpit and confessional.

References 

18th-century Roman Catholic bishops in Spain
1774 births
1827 deaths
Bishops of Urgell